Hans Mengel (6 February 1917 – 1 January 1943) was a German footballer who played as a midfielder for TuRU Düsseldorf and the Germany national team.

Personal life
Mengel served in the German Army during the Second World War. He was reported missing in action on the Eastern Front on 1 January 1943. He is commemorated at Sologubovka Cemetery.

References

1917 births
1943 deaths
Association football midfielders
German footballers
Germany international footballers
TuRU Düsseldorf players
German Army personnel of World War II
German Army personnel killed in World War II
Missing in action of World War II
Footballers from Cologne
Military personnel from Cologne